An affine vector field (sometimes affine collineation or affine) is a projective vector field preserving geodesics and preserving the affine parameter. Mathematically, this is expressed by the following condition:

See also

 Conformal vector field
 Curvature collineation
 Homothetic vector field
 Killing vector field
 Matter collineation
 Spacetime symmetries

Mathematical methods in general relativity